A program chain (PGC) is a linear sequence of programs, or 8-bit pointers to groups of cells. This allows for seamless branching in DVD playback, such as would be required for multi-angle scenes. The first PGC in a DVD title is called the entry PGC. A PGC with no programs is called a dummy PGC. Each PGC has a color palette of 16 colors, recorded in YCbCr format.

References

DVD